Georg Hartung (13 July 1821- 28 March 1891) was a pioneering German  geologist.  He is best known for several books and articles about the islands of Macaronesia, especially the Azores, Madeira and the Canary Islands.

The work of Hartung on the Azores contains illustrations of great scientific interest.  Georg Hartung also met and corresponded with Charles Darwin and with Sir Charles Lyell, the pioneer of modern geology, from whom he received scientific samples.  He visited the Canary Islands in the winter of 1853 and the spring of 1854.

Selected works

 Hartung. Mitbeschreibung der fossilen reste, von Prof. H. G. Bronn ..., Wilhelm Engelmann, Leipzig, 1860.
 Fritsch, Karl Wilhelm Georg von Hartung, Georg Reiss, Johann Wilhelm. Tenerife geologisch-topographisch dargestellt, ein Beitrag zur Kenntniss vulkanischer Gebirge von K. v. Fritsch, G. Hartung und W. Reiss, J. Wurster, 16 pp., 1867.
 Hartung, Georg. Die geologischen Verhältnisse der Inseln Lanzarote und Fuertaventura, Zürich, 166 pp., 1857.
 Hartung, Georg. Betrachtungen über Erhebungskrater, ältere und neuere Eruptivmassen, nebst einer Schilderung der geologischen Verhältnisse der Insel Gran Canaria. Wilhelm Engelmann, Leipzig, 108 pp., 1862.
 Hartung, Georg. Originalzeichnungen und Probedrucke zu Illustrationen der geologischen Beschreibungen der Azoren und Kanarischen Inseln. 1850 [ca.]

References

19th-century German geologists
Geology of the Azores
History of the Canary Islands
1820s births
1891 deaths
German male writers